Malkhas Amoyan (born 22 January 1999) is an Armenian Greco-Roman wrestler. He won the gold medal in the men's 72 kg event at the 2021 World Wrestling Championships held in Oslo, Norway, and he also won the gold medal in the men's 77 kg event at the 2022 European Wrestling Championships held in Budapest, Hungary.

Career 

In 2020, he won the silver medal in the 72 kg event at the Individual Wrestling World Cup held in Belgrade, Serbia.

He won the gold medal in the 72 kg event at the 2021 World Wrestling Championships held in Oslo, Norway. In 2021, he also won the silver medal in the 72 kg event at the European Wrestling Championships held in Warsaw, Poland.

He won the gold medal in the 77 kg event at the 2022 European Wrestling Championships held in Budapest, Hungary. He won one of the bronze medals in the 77kg event at the 2022 World Wrestling Championships held in Belgrade, Serbia.

Personal life 

His uncle Roman Amoyan is a retired competitive wrestler.

Achievements

References

External links 

 

Living people
1999 births
Sportspeople from Yerevan
Armenian male sport wrestlers
European Wrestling Championships medalists
World Wrestling Champions
European Wrestling Champions
20th-century Armenian people
21st-century Armenian people